Rudava is a river in western Slovakia, Záhorie region. It is a left tributary to the river Morava. Part of this river flows through the military district of Záhorie.

Etymology
The name comes from Slavic ruda—red soil or red creek. 1592 fluv. Rudauua.

References

Rivers of Slovakia